John Portor "Hump" Tanner (December 3, 1897 – December 23, 1976) was a professional American football player in the early National Football League with the Toledo Maroons, Cleveland Indians and Cleveland Bulldogs. He began his football playing at Owensboro High School. He then played at the college level for Centre College.

He played for the Praying Colonels in the infamous 1921 Centre vs. Harvard football game. The Colonels (under coach Charley Moran) shocked Harvard University and became the first school ever from outside the East to beat one of the Ivy League's "Big Three" of Harvard, Yale, and Princeton.

Tanner was a teammate as well as close friend of Jim Thorpe, who was considered the greatest athlete of his era.

References

Owensboro-Daviess County Hall of Fame

1897 births
Players of American football from Kentucky
Centre Colonels football players
Toledo Maroons players
Cleveland Bulldogs players
Cleveland Indians (NFL 1923) players
Sportspeople from Owensboro, Kentucky
1976 deaths